Enrique O. Aragón (1880–1942) was a Mexican philosopher and physician, once alternative rector of Mexico's National Autonomous University.

He studied in the National Preparatory school and on 1891 got into the National School of Medicin, where he reached his degree as a doctor, surgeon, and obstetrician on 12 April 1904.

He died on 1942. There is a highschool with his name in Iztapalapa, Federal District.

National Autonomous University of Mexico alumni
Academic staff of the National Autonomous University of Mexico
Mexican obstetricians
1880 births
1942 deaths
People from Mexico City